The individual competition was a modern pentathlon event held as part of the Modern pentathlon at the 1964 Summer Olympics programme.  One segment of the pentathlon was held each day, from 11 October to 15 October 1964.

Medalists

Results

Equestrian

Fencing

Ferenc Török was the most successful fencer, with a record of 27-9 propelling him to the 1000 points awarded to the best record. Other fencers lost 36 points from that 1000 for each loss beyond 9.

Shooting

Swimming

Running

Sources

 

Modern pentathlon at the 1964 Summer Olympics